Joel Holleman (October 1, 1799 – August 5, 1844) was an American politician and lawyer from Virginia. A Democrat, he served in the United States House of Representatives and as Speaker of the Virginia House of Delegates.

Personal life
Holleman was born in Isle of Wight County, Virginia to John Holleman and Nancy Thomas Holleman. He graduated from the University of North Carolina and attended law school there. He was a teacher before his admission to the bar. He eventually set up a law practice at Burwell Bay, Virginia, in Isle of Wight County. He was highly regarded by peers and recognized as a top lawyer in southern Virginia.

On November 22, 1828, Holleman married Caroline Carroll of Isle of Wight County. She died in 1842. He later married his sister-in-law, Emily W. Carroll.

Political career

Holleman was first elected to the Virginia House of Delegates in 1832. He moved to the Senate of Virginia in 1836.

Holleman was elected to the Twenty-sixth Congress, taking office in 1839. At the time of his election, he made a public statement that he would resign his seat if the Whigs won his district in the 1840 presidential election. After William Henry Harrison did so, Holleman resigned.

After Congress
He was reelected to the House of Delegates in 1841 and became Speaker the following year.

On April 3, 1844, a few months before his death, he married his sister-in-law, Emily W. Carroll.

He died in Smithfield, Virginia, August 5, 1844 at the age of 44. He was interred in Ivy Hill Cemetery.

Notes

References

External links

1799 births
1844 deaths
Virginia lawyers
Speakers of the Virginia House of Delegates
Democratic Party members of the United States House of Representatives from Virginia
Virginia state senators
People from Isle of Wight County, Virginia
19th-century American politicians
19th-century American lawyers